Adampur is a village in Varanasi tehsil of Varanasi district in the Indian state of Uttar Pradesh. The village falls under the Adampur gram panchayat.

Demography
Adampur  has 363 families with a total population of 2,897. Sex ratio of the village is 906 and child sex ratio is 944. Uttar Pradesh state average for both ratios is 912 and 902 respectively  .

Transportation
Adampur is connected by air (Lal Bahadur Shastri Airport), by train (Varanasi City railway station) and by road. Nearest operational airport is Lal Bahadur Shastri Airport and nearest operational railway station is Varanasi City railway station (25 and 1.5 kilometers respectively from Adampur).

See also
 Varanasi tehsil
 Varanasi district
 Varanasi North
 Varanasi (Lok Sabha constituency)

Notes

  All demographic data is based on 2011 Census of India.

References 

Villages in Varanasi district